The Alecu Russo State University (USARB; Romanian: Universitatea de Stat „Alecu Russo” din Bălți) is a university located in Bălți, Moldova. It was named after the 19th century Romanian illuminist and ethnologist Alecu Russo.

History
The original complex of buildings in the 1930s housed the financial administration, three high schools (two of which were girls-only) and has the characteristic architecture of the time. The institution was founded in 1945. Languages (English, French, German, Romanian, Russian, Ukrainian), mathematics, physics, some engineering, law, economics, music education, pedagogy, sociology, and psychology are offered at Bachelor and Master levels. There is a Ph.D. programme. Many of its buildings have been added or refurbished more recently. The courses and specialties are offered in Romanian, Russian, Ukrainian, and English. The university houses one of the biggest libraries in the southeastern Europe, and is an important member of the implementation of the Bologna process in Moldova.

Faculties 
Alecu Russo Balti State University faculties:
 Faculty of Real Sciences
 Faculty of Philology
 Faculty of Foreign Languages and Literatures
 Faculty of Psychology and Social Work
 Faculty of Sciences of Education and Arts
 Faculty of Law
 Faculty of Economics
 Faculty of Natural Science and Agroecology

See also
 List of universities in Moldova
 Education in Moldova

References

External links 
 
Official website of Alecu Russo Balti State University 

Alecu Russo State University of Bălți
Buildings and structures in Bălți